Zapotlán de Juárez  is a town and one of the 84 municipalities of Hidalgo, in central-eastern Mexico. The municipality covers an area of 131.1 km2.

As of 2005, the municipality had a total population of 16,493.

In this municipality is produced agricole products and meat.

The municipality have 20 km. of the Mexico-Pachuca Highway, and have another 18 km. of federal roads between the tree principal towns of the municipality (Zapotlán, San Pedro Huaquilpan and Acayuca).

The municipality is located in the southern part of Hidalgo and borders on the municipalities of Pachuca to the North, Tolcayuca to the South and West, Zempoala to the East, and Tezontepec to the South.

References

Municipalities of Hidalgo (state)
Populated places in Hidalgo (state)